Lost on You is the fourth studio album by American singer-songwriter LP. It was released on December 9, 2016, through Vagrant Records in Canada and several European countries.

Track listing

Charts

Weekly charts

Year-end charts

Certifications

Release history

References

2016 albums
LP (singer) albums
Vagrant Records albums